Zgornji Gabernik is a settlement in the Municipality of Rogaška Slatina in eastern Slovenia. It lies at the southwestern foothills of Mount Boč. The wider area around Rogaška Slatina is part of the traditional region of Styria. It is now included in the Savinja Statistical Region.

Name
The name of the village was changed from Zgornji Gabrnik to Zgornji Gabernik in 2002.

References

External links
Zgornji Gabernik on Geopedia

Populated places in the Municipality of Rogaška Slatina